Cynthia Westcott (June 29, 1898 – March 22, 1983) was an American plant pathologist, author, and expert on roses. She published a number of books and handbooks on horticulture and plant disease. Her work was also featured in The New York Times, House and Garden, and The American Home. Westcott was nicknamed "the plant doctor" after her first book of the same name.

Education 
Cynthia Westcott was born in North Attleboro, Massachusetts on June 29, 1898. She received her undergraduate degree from Wellesley College in 1920 and her Ph.D in plant pathology from Cornell University in 1932.

Career 
She wrote seven books during her lifetime, the first being "The Plant Doctor which was published in 1937. She also published the "The Gardeners Bug Book" in 1946. She also gave lecutures on pest control duing World War II. Westcott was also known for her annual Rose Day Open where she allowed hundreds of visitors to visit her gardens in Glen Ridge. 

Westcott was the subject of a biographical profile in The New Yorker  in July 1952.

Death 
Cynthia Westcott died of a heart ailment on March 22, 1983 in North Tarrytown, New York. The Cynthia Westcott Papers, an archive of Westcott's research notes and business correspondence, is located at Cornell University Library.

Awards and honors
 American Horticultural Council (1955) 
 Gold Medal, American Rose Society (1960) 
 Gold Medal, Garden Club of New Jersey 
 Garden Writers Award, American Association of Nurserymen (1963)

Works 
 Westcott, C. (1937). The Plant Doctor: The How, Why, and When of Disease and Insect Control in Your Garden. New York: Frederick A. Stokes.
Westcott, C. (1946). The Gardener's Bug Book; 1,000 Insect Pests and Their Control. New York: American Garden Guild and Doubleday. 
Westcott, C. (1950). Plant Disease Handbook. New York: Van Nostrand.
Westcott, C. (1952). Anyone Can Grow Roses. Toronto: Van Nostrand.
Westcott, C. (1953). Garden Enemies. Princeton, NJ: D. Van Nostrand.
Westcott, C. (1957). Plant Doctoring is Fun. Princeton, NJ: Van Nostrand.
Westcott, C. (1961). Are You Your Garden's Worst Pest? Garden City, NY: Doubleday.
Westcott, C. and Jerry T. Walker, eds. (1966). Handbook on Garden Pests. Brooklyn, NY: Brooklyn Botanic Garden.
Westcott, C. and Peter K. Nelson, eds. (1980). Handbook on Biological Control of Plant Pests. Special issue of Plants & Gardens, Vol. 16, No. 3. Brooklyn, NY: Brooklyn Botanic Garden.

Bibliography 
 Horst, R. Kenneth. (1984). "Pioneer Leaders in Plant Pathology: Cynthia Westcott, Plant Doctor." Annual Review of Phytopathology 22: 21-26.
 Kinkead, Eugene. (1952, July 26). "Profiles: Physician in the Flowerbeds." The New Yorker, 26-43.

References

1898 births
1983 deaths
American garden writers
American phytopathologists
Women phytopathologists
Cornell University alumni
Wellesley College alumni
Women horticulturists and gardeners
20th-century agronomists